Sellada is a mountain pass between the peaks of Profitis Ilias and Mesa Vouno, near the village of Kamari in the island of Santorini, Greece. The NE and NW slopes of Sellada accommodated the necropolis (i.e. cemetery) of Ancient Thera, Santorini's classical antiquity city. Excavations in Sellada during the years 1961 - 1982 by Nikolaos Zapheiropoulos have uncovered several tombs with funeral gifts, pithoi, and funerary kouroi and korai, some of which are exhibited at Fira archaeological museum.

References

External links
Harvard.edu, Sellada 2001 Overview
Activities & Holiday Trips on Santorini

Santorini
Ancient Thera